Naked Economics: Undressing the Dismal Science is a book by Charles Wheelan that seeks to translate basic economic issues into a format that can be easily read by people with little or no previous knowledge of economics.  The Chicago Tribune described the book as "Translat[ing] the arcane and often inscrutable jargon of the professional economist into language accessible to the inquiring but frustrated layman." A fully revised and updated version of the book with a foreword by Burton Malkiel was published in 2010.

It has been translated into eleven languages.

References

Economics books
2002 non-fiction books
W. W. Norton & Company books